{{Infobox military conflict
|conflict = Battle of the Metaxas Line
|partof  = the Battle of Greece
|image = German_MarkIII_Metaxas_line.JPG
|caption = German tank set on fire by Greek Artillery, April 1941.
|date = 6–9 April 1941
|place = Greek-Bulgarian border
|result = German victory
|combatant1 = 
|combatant2 = 
|commander1 =  Wilhelm List
|commander2 =  Konstantinos Bakopoulos
|strength1 =  2nd Panzer Division XVIII Army Corps 6th Mountain Division 5th Mountain Division2 Armored divisions5 infantry divisions2 independent enhanced infantry regiments650 aircraft
|strength2 = Eastern Macedonian Army 19th Mechanized Division 14th Infantry Division 18th Infantry Division5 divisions188 field artillery pieces76 anti-tank guns30 anti-aircraft guns40 tankettes
|casualties1 =1400+ killed192+ missing2,403+ woundedTotal 3.995+
|casualties2 =unknown
}}

The Battle of the Metaxas Line, also known in Greece as the Battle of the Forts', was the first battle during the German invasion of Greece in World War II. The Germans succeeded in capturing several individual forts but failed to breach the fortified Metaxas Line in general.  The 2nd Panzer division (XVIII Mountain Corps) with an enveloping move crossed the Yugoslavian borders, overcame Yugoslav and Greek resistance and captured Thessaloniki on the 9th of April. The capture of Thessaloniki forced the Greek East Macedonia Army Section to surrender on the 10th of April and the Metaxas Line battle was over.

German General Wilhelm List, commander of the German forces attacking Greece, admired the bravery and courage of these soldiers. He refrained from taking the Greek soldiers prisoner and declared that the army was free to leave with their war flags, on condition that they surrender their arms and supplies. He also ordered his soldiers and officers to salute the Greek soldiers (Beevor 2005, p. 20). At the time, the Metaxas line was poorly manned, as most of the Greek Army was involved in the Greco-Italian War on the Albanian front.

Prelude
Origins of the campaign
The origins of the battle lie in the Italian invasion of Greece, which took place on 28 October 1940. The failure of the Italian Army to bring a favourable end to this Greek-Italian war, forced the Germans to intervene, with an operation they dubbed Operation Marita.

For the purpose of the invasion of Greece, Germany tried to bring Greece's northern neighbours, Bulgaria and Yugoslavia, to the Tripartite Pact alliance. Bulgaria agreed to allow passage of German troops for the attack on Greece, although Bulgarian troops would not participate in combat. Yugoslavia also agreed, but a coup overthrew the Yugoslav government. Although the pact was not denounced, Hitler decided to attack Yugoslavia as well as Greece.

The Metaxas Line
The fortification of the area informally known as the Metaxas Line was conceived as a defensive measure against Bulgaria. Bulgaria had refused to sign the Balkan Pact signed by Greece, Yugoslavia, Turkey and Romania in 1934 which aimed at maintaining the geopolitical status quo in the region following World War I. The Metaxas Line was a series of independent forts along the Greek-Bulgarian border, built on possible routes of invasion. Each fort's garrisons belonged to the division or brigade which controlled the respective border sector. The fortifications were built with the meagre resources that Greece could muster, and exploited at fullest the terrain. Construction had begun in 1936; however, by 1941 the line was still incomplete.

Opposing forces
German
The German unit detailed for the invasion of Greece was the 12th Army under Field-Marshal Wilhelm List, with a total of 15 divisions and other elements. Of those the XVIII and XXX Corps were to be used against Metaxas Line:

XVIII Mountain Corps (Lt. Gen. Franz Böhme)
2nd Panzerdivision (Lt. Gen. Rudolf Veiel)
5th Mountain Division (Mj. Gen. Julius Ringel)
6th Mountain Division (Mj. Gen. Ferdinand Schörner)
72nd Infantry Division (Mj. Gen. Philipp Müller-Gebhard)
independent 125th Infantry Regiment (Col. Erich Petersen)
XXX Corps (Lt. Gen. Otto Hartmann)
50th Infantry Division (Mj. Gen. Karl Adolf Hollidt)
164th Infantry Division (Mj. Gen. Josef Folttmann)

Greek and Yugoslav
The Greek units responsible for the Metaxas Line were the Eastern Macedonia Army Section under Lieutenant General Konstantinos Bakopoulos and the independent Evros Brigade under Major General Ioannis Zisis:

Eastern Macedonia Army Section (Lt. Gen. Konstantinos Bakopoulos)
Group of Divisions (Lt. Gen. Panagiotis Dedes)
18th Infantry Division (Mj. Gen. Leonidas Stergiopoulos)
70 & 81 & 91 Inf.Reg.; (total: six battalions, five forts, 52 guns)
14th Infantry Division (Mj. Gen. Konstantinos Papakonstantinou)
41 & 73 Inf.Reg. (total: seven battalions, eight forts, 90 guns)
7th Infantry Division (Mj. Gen. Christos Zoiopoulos)
26 & 71 & 92 Inf. Reg. (10 battalions, six forts, 76 guns)
Nestos Infantry Brigade (Col. Anastasios Kalis)
37 & 93 Inf.Reg.; (total: five battalions, one fort, 16 guns)
19th Mechanized Division (Mj. Gen. Nikolaos Lioumbas)
191 & 192 & 193 Mot.Reg., Krousia Detachment; (total: three tankette battalions, three motorised battalions, two infantry battalions, 36 guns)
West Thrace Zone of operations (Mj. Gen Ioannis Zisis)
Evros Infantry Brigade (Mj. Gen. Ioannis Zisis)
Soufli & Komotini & Pythio border battalions; (total: three battalions, one fort, no guns)

The Yugoslav force that contributed directly to the defence of Metaxas Line was the 20th "Bregalnička" Infantry Division, part of the 3rd Territorial Army of the Yugoslav army. It confronted the German 2nd Panzerdivision, which would attempt to outflank the entire Greek position crossing into Greece from Yugoslav territory.
20th "Bregalnička''" Infantry Division (Lt. Gen. Dragutin I. Živanović)
23 & 28 & 49 Inf. Reg., 20 Art. Reg.

Notes

Footnotes

the Metaxas Line
the Metaxas Line
1941 in Greece
the Metaxas Line
Metaxas Line
April 1941 events